The Gold Oak Union School District is an elementary school district in El Dorado County, California, United States. The district offers elementary and middle school services and serves an area known as Pleasant Valley near the city of Placerville. The District retained the firm of Earth Metrics Inc. to forecast enrollment growth and other demographic projections through the year 2020 in order to arrive at a facilities and staffing master plan.

See also
Mother Lode
Placerville, California

References

External links
 

School districts in El Dorado County, California